Mark John Nelson (born 9 August 1969, in Bellshill) is a Scottish former professional footballer who made more than 300 appearances in the Scottish Football League playing as a defender.

References

1969 births
Living people
Footballers from Bellshill
Scottish footballers
Association football defenders
Airdrieonians F.C. (1878) players
Stenhousemuir F.C. players
Dumbarton F.C. players
Alloa Athletic F.C. players
Hamilton Academical F.C. players
Scottish Football League players